Commerce Reports is an official publication of the United States Department of Commerce, published weekly.  It was first published October 1, 1880.  Extant archival copies have been digitized and are part of the Google Books digital library available online.  Archival editions have also been digitized by the Digital Library Federation.

Name history 
The first publication was on October 1, 1880, as a monthly under the name Consular Reports.  On January 1, 1898, it became a daily under the same name.  On July 1, 1905, it was renamed Daily Consular and Trade Reports.  On January 1, 1915, it was renamed Commerce Reports.

Volume history 
Commerce Reports (sample issue)
 Volume 3, Issues 40–52, October, November, December 1922
Supplements to Commerce Reports (sample issue)
 Review of Industrial and Trade Conditions of Foreign Countries in 1917 ...

Library references 
 Commerce Reports 
 Supplement to Commerce Reports

References 

Publications of the United States government
United States Department of Commerce